The maned rat or (African) crested rat (Lophiomys imhausi) is a nocturnal, long-haired and bushy-tailed East African rodent that superficially resembles a porcupine. The world's only poisonous rodent, the maned rat borrows toxins from plants to fend off predators.

Description
The coat consists of long, silver and black-tipped guard hairs over a dense, woolly, grey and white undercoat, with the face and limbs having short, black fur. A mane of longer, coarser black-and-white banded hairs extends from the top of the animal's head to just beyond the base of the tail. This mane is bordered by a broad, white-bordered strip of hairs covering an area of glandular skin. The forelimbs and hind limbs have short black fur. The forefeet are large and digit 1 of the forefeet does not have a claw while digits 2-5 have a well developed claw.

When the animal is threatened or excited, the mane erects and this strip parts, exposing the glandular area. The hairs in this area are, at the tips, like ordinary hair, but are otherwise spongy, fibrous, and absorbent with a honeycomb structure. The rat is known to deliberately smear these hairs with poison from the bark of the Acokanthera schimperi, the poison arrow tree, on which it chews, thus creating a defense mechanism that can sicken or even kill predators which attempt to bite it. It is the only mammal known to utilize and store toxins from a different species in nature to protect itself, with no known adverse effects to themselves.  

L. imhausi differs from typical Muridae in having the temporal fossa roofed over a thin plate of bone, rudimentary clavicles, and an opposable hallux. The dorsal surface of the skull is covered with small bony projections which gives it a pebbled look. The projections are 0.3mm across and are separated every 0.3mm. On these grounds, it has been made the type of a family; its dentition, however, is typical Cricetine. The dental formula is 1/1, 0/0, 0/0, 3/3, giving it a total of 16 teeth. The cusps of the molars are arranged biserially and connected medially by longitudinal enamel crests.

Diet
Its diet in the wild consists largely of leaves, fruit, and other plant material, but it has been known to eat meat, cereals, root vegetables, and insects in captivity. Food is eaten by sitting on its haunches and using its forepaws to bring food items to its mouth. It is the only species in the super family Muroidea whose stomach is highly compartmentalized. The stomach contains five anatomically discrete sections that superficially resemble the sacculated configuration characteristic of ruminant artiodactyls. By virtue of its large size and biomass, L. imhausi may be one of the few muroid rodents that can harbor a symbiotic microflora in the foregut and profit metabolically from gastric fermentation of cellulose.

Habitat
The habitat of the maned rat ranges from nearly sea level, in Ethiopia and Somalia, to more typically the drier, highland forests and woodlands of Somalia, Ethiopia, Sudan, Tanzania, Uganda, and Kenya. Fossil remains have been found as far north as Israel, however. They are often found in rocky areas or in hollow tree trunks and holes along the tops of ravines, and have also been found nesting among rocks on cliff-faces.

Reproduction
The maned rat was believed to be solitary, but is now known to be somewhat sociable, with multiple animals trapped in the same territory; they purr and groom one another. Thus it is possible they form family groups of a male, female, and offspring.
The litter size is 1–3. The young are slightly haired at birth and white markings and black stripes on the body are visible after 9 days. By day 13, the eyes open. The hair is sufficiently long that the crest can be erectile by day 20. The newborns become mobile by day 23 and are weaned by day 40.

Citations

General and cited references 
Jansa, S. A. and M. Weksler. 2004. Phylogeny of muroid rodents: relationships within and among major lineages as determined by IRBP gene sequences.  Molecular Phylogenetics and Evolution, 31:256-276.
Kingdon, Jonathan. East African Mammals. Chicago: University of Chicago Press, 1974. 519–526.
 Jonathan Kingdon, Bernard Agwanda, Margaret Kinnaird, Timothy O'Brien, Christopher Holland, Tom Gheysens, Maxime Boulet-Audet and Fritz Vollrath 2011 A poisonous surprise under the coat of the African crested rat Proc. R. Soc. B  
 Jonathan Kingdon, David Happold, Thomas Butynski, Michael Hoffmann, Meredith Happold, Jan Kalina, Mammals of Africa, Vol. 1-6
 Jonathan Kingdon, The Kingdon Field Guide to African Mammals
  Database entry includes a brief justification of why this species is of least concern

External links

 
 Video of animal, hair wicking fluid and SEM image of hair on YouTube: https://www.youtube.com/watch?v=pLheG3aSpVU

Mammals described in 1867
Muridae
Rodents of Africa